The Ankeniheny-Zahamena Corridor (CAZ) is a large area of protected forest biome in eastern Madagascar. The CAZ encompasses some 3,810 km, making it one of the largest areas of rainforest remaining in the country. Over 2,000 species of plants have been recorded in the CAZ, nearly 1,700 of which are endemic to the region.

This area is the main source of water in the eastern and western part of Madagascar.

It received the status of a natural resource reserve in 2015.

Flora and fauna 
The CAZ is an area of enormous biodiversity: fifteen species of lemur have been recorded in it, at least three of which (the indri, the black-and-white ruffed lemur, and the diademed sifaka) are known to be threatened.

Some 30 other mammal species, 129 amphibian species, and 89 avian species have been recorded in the CAZ.

See also
National parks of Madagascar

References

External links

Protected areas of Madagascar
Alaotra-Mangoro
Protected areas established in 2007